Hernán Alexis Altolaguirre (born February 19, 1993) is an Argentine footballer currently playing for the Sardinian team Atletico Uri of the Serie D, the Italian fourth division.

Altolaguirre began his career with Newell's Old Boys. He was sent out on a one-year loan to Ligue 2's Thonon Evian Grand Genève FC in August 2015. After leaving Newell's, Altolaguirre would play in the lower levels of Argentine and Peruvian football. His best season would come in the Torneo Federal A with Club Rivadavia, before he signed for Primera Nacional side Guillermo Brown de Puerto Madryn. After a poor season with Guillermo Brown, Altolaguirre joined Federal A side Club Cipolletti.

Titles
 Newell's Old Boys 2013 (Torneo Final Primera División Argentina Championship)

References

 Profile at BDFA 
 

1993 births
Living people
Argentine expatriate footballers
Argentine footballers
Newell's Old Boys footballers
Cobreloa footballers
Chilean Primera División players
Argentine Primera División players
Expatriate footballers in Chile
Association football forwards
People from Santa Rosa, La Pampa